Gunnera perpensa,  is a species of Gunnera found in Madagascar.

References

perpensa
Endemic flora of Madagascar
Taxa named by Carl Linnaeus